Sir Henry Irving (6 February 1838 – 13 October 1905), christened John Henry Brodribb, sometimes known as J. H. Irving, was an English stage actor in the Victorian era, known as an actor-manager because he took complete responsibility (supervision of sets, lighting, direction, casting, as well as playing the leading roles) for season after season at the West End’s Lyceum Theatre, establishing himself and his company as representative of English classical theatre. In 1895 he became the first actor to be awarded a knighthood, indicating full acceptance into the higher circles of British society.

Life and career
Irving was born to a working-class family in Keinton Mandeville in the county of Somerset. W.H. Davies, the celebrated poet, was a cousin. Irving spent his childhood living with his aunt, Mrs Penberthy, at Halsetown in Cornwall. He competed in a recitation contest at a local Methodist chapel where he was beaten by William Curnow, later the editor of The Sydney Morning Herald. He attended City Commercial School for two years before going to work in the office of a law firm at age 13. When he saw Samuel Phelps play Hamlet soon after this, he sought lessons, letters of introduction, and work in the Lyceum Theatre in Sunderland in 1856, labouring against great odds until his 1871 success in The Bells in London set him apart from all the rest.

He married Florence O'Callaghan on 15 July 1869 at St. Marylebone, London, but his personal life took second place to his professional life. On opening night of The Bells, 25 November 1871, Florence, who was pregnant with their second child, criticised his profession: "Are you going on making a fool of yourself like this all your life?" Irving exited their carriage at Hyde Park Corner, walked off into the night, and chose never to see her again.  He maintained a discreet distance from his children as well, but became closer to them as they grew older. Florence Irving never divorced Irving, and once he had been knighted she styled herself "Lady Irving"; Irving never remarried.

His elder son, Harry Brodribb Irving (1870–1919), usually known as "H B Irving", became a famous actor and later a theatre manager. His younger son, Laurence Irving (1871–1914), became a dramatist and later drowned, with his wife Mabel Hackney, in the sinking of the Empress of Ireland. H B married Dorothea Baird and they had a son, Laurence Irving (1897–1988), who became a well-known Hollywood art director and his grandfather's biographer.

In November 1882 Irving became a Freemason, being initiated into the prestigious Jerusalem Lodge No 197 in London. In 1887 he became a founder member and first Treasurer of the Savage Club Lodge No 2190, a Lodge associated with London's Savage Club.

He eventually took over the management of the Lyceum Theatre and brought actress Ellen Terry into partnership with him as Ophelia to his Hamlet, Lady Macbeth to his Macbeth, Portia to his Shylock, Beatrice to his Benedick, etc. Before joining the Lyceum, Terry had fled her first marriage and conceived two out-of-wedlock children with architect-designer Edward William Godwin, but regardless of how much and how often her behavior defied the strict morality expected by her Victorian audiences, she somehow remained popular.  It could be said that Irving found his family in his professional company, which included his ardent supporter and manager Bram Stoker and Terry's two illegitimate children, Teddy and Edy.

Whether Irving's long, spectacularly successful relationship with leading lady Ellen Terry was romantic as well as professional has been the subject of much historical speculation.  Most of their correspondence was lost or burned by her descendants.  According to Michael Holroyd's book about Irving and Terry, A Strange Eventful History:

Terry's son Teddy, later known as Edward Gordon Craig, spent much of his childhood (from 1879, when he was 8, until 1897) indulged by Irving backstage at the Lyceum. Craig, who came to be regarded as something of a visionary for the theatre of the future, wrote an especially vivid, book-length tribute to Irving.  ("Let me state at once, in clearest unmistakable terms, that I have never known of, or seen, or heard, a greater actor than was Irving.") George Bernard Shaw, at the time a theatre critic who was jealous of Irving's connection to Ellen Terry (whom Shaw himself wanted in his own plays), conceded Irving's genius after Irving died.

Early career

After a few years' schooling while living at Halsetown, near St Ives, Cornwall, Irving became a clerk to a firm of East India merchants in London, but he soon gave up a commercial career for acting. On 29 September 1856 he made his first appearance at Sunderland as Gaston, Duke of Orleans, in Bulwer Lytton's play, Richelieu, billed as Henry Irving. This name he eventually assumed by royal licence. When the inexperienced Irving got stage fright and was hissed off the stage the actor Samuel Johnson was among those who supported him with practical advice. Later in life Irving gave them all regular work when he formed his own Company at the Lyceum Theatre.

For 10 years, he went through an arduous training in various stock companies in Scotland and the north of England, taking more than 500 parts.

He gained recognition by degrees, and in 1866 Ruth Herbert engaged him as her leading man and sometime stage director at the St. James's Theatre, London, where she first played Doricourt in The Belle's Stratagem. One piece that he directed there was W. S. Gilbert's first successful solo play, Dulcamara, or the Little Duck and the Great Quack (1866) The next year he joined the company of the newly opened Queen's Theatre, where he acted with Charles Wyndham, J. L. Toole, Lionel Brough, John Clayton, Mr. and Mrs. Alfred Wigan, Ellen Terry and Nellie Farren. This was followed by short engagements at the Haymarket Theatre, Drury Lane, and the Gaiety Theatre. In the spring of 1869, Irving was one of the original twelve members of The Lambs of London—assembled by John Hare as a social club for actors—and would be made an Honorary Lifetime member in 1883. He finally made his first conspicuous success as Digby Grant in James Albery's Two Roses, which was produced at the Vaudeville Theatre on 4 June 1870 and ran for a very successful 300 nights.

In 1871, Irving began his association with the Lyceum Theatre by an engagement under Bateman's management. The fortunes of the house were at a low ebb when the tide was turned by Irving's sudden success as Mathias in The Bells, a version of Erckmann-Chatrian's Le Juif polonais by Leopold Lewis, a property which Irving had found for himself. The play ran for 150 nights, established Irving at the forefront of the British drama, and would prove a popular vehicle for Irving for the rest of his professional life.

With Bateman, Irving was seen in W. G. Wills' Charles I and Eugene Aram, in Richelieu, and in 1874 in Hamlet. The unconventionality of this last performance, during a run of 200 nights, aroused keen discussion and singled him out as the most interesting English actor of his day. In 1875, again with Bateman, he was seen as the title character in Macbeth; in 1876 as Othello, and as Philip in Alfred Lord Tennyson's Queen Mary; in 1877 in Richard III; and in The Lyons Mail. During this time he became lifelong friends with Bram Stoker, who praised him in his review of Hamlet and thereafter joined Irving as the manager for the company.

Peak years

In 1878, Irving entered into a partnership with actress Ellen Terry and re-opened the Lyceum under his own management. With Terry as Ophelia and Portia, he revived Hamlet and produced The Merchant of Venice (1879). His Shylock was as much discussed as his Hamlet had been, the dignity with which he invested the vengeful Jewish merchant marking a departure from the traditional interpretation of the role.

After the production of Tennyson's The Cup and revivals of Othello (in which Irving played Iago to Edwin Booth's title character) and Romeo and Juliet, there began a period at the Lyceum which had a potent effect on the English stage.

Much Ado about Nothing (1882) was followed by Twelfth Night (1884); an adaptation of Goldsmith's Vicar of Wakefield by W. G. Wills (1885); Faust (1885); Macbeth (1888, with incidental music by Arthur Sullivan); The Dead Heart, by Watts Phillips (1889); Ravenswood by Herman, and Merivales' dramatic version of Scott's Bride of Lammermoor (1890). Portrayals in 1892 of the characters of Wolsey in Henry VIII and of the title character in King Lear were followed in 1893 by a performance of Becket in Tennyson's play of the same name. During these years, too, Irving, with the whole Lyceum company, paid several successful visits to the United States and Canada, which were repeated in succeeding years.  As Terry aged, there seemed to be fewer opportunities for her in his company; that was one reason she eventually left, moving on into less steady but nonetheless beloved stage work, including solo performances of Shakespeare's women.

Safety theatres

In 1887, the Exeter Theatre Royal fire claimed the lives of 186 people, injuring dozens more, during a performance of The Romany Rye being staged by fellow actor-manager Wilson Barrett at the Theatre Royal, Exeter.

Irving was one of the first high-profile people to donate to the relief fund for survivors and orphans, sending £100.

The fire caused Irving to become involved in ensuring better safety for theatres, and he developed the "Irving Safety Theatre" principles, working with eminent architect Alfred Darbyshire. These principles included making the theatre site isolated, dividing the auditorium from the back of house, a minimum height above street level for any part of the audience, providing two separate exits for every section of the audience, improved stage construction including a smoke flue, and fire-resistant construction throughout.

The first theatre built to these principles was the rebuilt New Theatre Royal in Exeter.

Influence on Bram Stoker's Dracula

From 1878, Bram Stoker worked for Irving as a business manager at the Lyceum. Stoker idolised Irving to the point that "As one contemporary remarked, 'To Bram, Irving is as a god, and can do no wrong.' In the considered judgment of one biographer, Stoker's friendship with Irving was 'the most important love relationship of his adult life.'" Irving, however, "… was a self-absorbed and profoundly manipulative man. He enjoyed cultivating rivalries between his followers, and to remain in his circle required constant, careful courting of his notoriously fickle affections." When Stoker began writing Dracula, Irving was the chief inspiration for the title character. In his 2002 paper for The American Historical Review, "Buffalo Bill Meets Dracula: William F. Cody, Bram Stoker, and the Frontiers of Racial Decay", historian Louis S. Warren writes:

Later years

The chief remaining novelties at the Lyceum during Irving's term as sole manager (at the beginning of 1899 the theatre passed into the hands of a limited-liability company) were Arthur Conan Doyle's Waterloo (1894); J. Comyns Carr's King Arthur in 1895; Cymbeline, in which Irving played Iachimo, in 1896; Sardou's Madame Sans-Gene in 1897; and Peter the Great, a play by Laurence Irving, the actor's second son, in 1898.

Irving received a death threat in 1899 from fellow actor (and murderer of William Terriss) Richard Archer Prince. Terriss had been stabbed at the stage door of the Adelphi Theatre in December 1897 and in the wake of his death, Prince was committed to Broadmoor Criminal Lunatic Asylum. Irving was critical of the unusually lenient sentence, remarking "Terriss was an actor, so his murderer will not be executed." Two years later, Prince had found Irving's home address and threatened to murder him "when he gets out". Irving was advised to submit the letter to the Home Office to ensure Prince's continued incarceration, which Irving declined to do.

In 1898 Irving was Rede Lecturer at the University of Cambridge. The new regime at the Lyceum was signalled by the production of Sardou's Robespierre in 1899, in which Irving reappeared after a serious illness, and in 1901 by an elaborate revival of Coriolanus. Irving's only subsequent production in London was as Sardou's Dante (1903) at the Drury Lane.

Death
On 13 October 1905, at 67 years old, Irving had completed a performance and suffered a stroke after returning to his lodging at the lobby of the Midland Hotel, Bradford, where he died before medical attention could arrive. A more dramatic, but untrue story, would later be written by Thomas Anstey Guthrie in his 'Long Retrospect': "Within three months, on October 13, 1905, Henry Irving, when appearing as Becket at the Bradford Theatre, was seized with syncope just after uttering Becket's dying words 'Into thy hands, O Lord, into thy hands', and though he lived for an hour or so longer he never spoke again." (Thomas Anstey Guthrie. "Long Retrospect")

Another witness at the play, Bram Stoker (known for being the author of Dracula), told reporters later that "We chatted for awhile after the play, and I left him, although not notably strong, not in any way cast down and not more exhausted than had been usual for some time. A little more than three-quarters of an hour afterward I was sent for by the man who attended Sir Henry from the theatre, who told me that he had fainted or collapsed on entering the Midland Hotel. Hurrying down, I found Sir Henry lying in the passage— dead." Stoker added, "Had he died on the stage, as might have happened, it would have given shock and bitter memory to many tender hearts." Guthrie's confusion may have come from the fact that the character Becket's last words in the play are "O Lord, into thy hands," but, as a correspondent noted, "Then the curtain falls, and within a very short time, having just reached his hotel, the great actor breathed his last."

The chair that he was sitting in before he died is now at the Garrick Club. He was cremated and his ashes buried in Westminster Abbey, thereby becoming the first person ever to be cremated prior to interment at Westminster.

There is a statue of him near the National Portrait Gallery in London. That statue, as well as the influence of Irving himself, plays an important part in the Robertson Davies novel World of Wonders. The Irving Memorial Garden was opened on 19 July 1951 by Laurence Olivier.

Legacy
Both on and off the stage, Irving always maintained a high ideal of his profession, and in 1895 he received a knighthood (first offered in 1883), the first ever accorded an actor. He was also the recipient of honorary degrees from the universities of Dublin (LL.D 1892), Cambridge (Litt.D 1898), and Glasgow (LL.D 1899).  He also received the Komthur Cross, 2nd class, of the Saxe-Ernestine House Order of Saxe-Coburg-Gotha and Saxe-Meiningen.

His acting divided critics; opinions differed as to the extent to which his mannerisms of voice and deportment interfered with or assisted the expression of his ideas.

Irving's idiosyncratic style of acting and its effect on amateur players was mildly satirised in The Diary of a Nobody. Mr Pooter's son brings Mr Burwin-Fosselton of the Holloway Comedians to supper, a young man who entirely monopolised the conversation, and:
"...who not only looked rather like Mr Irving but seemed to imagine he was the celebrated actor... he began doing the Irving business all through supper. He sank so low down in his chair that his chin was almost on a level with the table, and twice he kicked Carrie under the table, upset his wine, and flashed a knife uncomfortably near Gowing's face."

In T. S. Eliot's poem, "Gus: The Theatre Cat" (ca. 1939), the title character's old age and theatrical distinction are expressed in the couplet:

For he once was a Star of the highest degree--
He has acted with Irving, he's acted with Tree.

These verses appear in the lyrics of the homonymous song in Andrew Lloyd Webber's 1981 musical Cats.
 
In the 1963 West End musical comedy Half a Sixpence the actor Chitterlow does an impression of Irving in The Bells. Percy French's burlesque heroic poem "Abdul Abulbul Amir" lists among the mock-heroic attributes of Abdul's adversary, the Russian Count Ivan Skavinsky Skavar, that "he could imitate Irving". In the 1995 film A Midwinter's Tale by Kenneth Branagh, two actors discuss Irving, and one of them, Richard Briers does an imitation of his speech. In the play The Woman in Black, set in the Victorian era, the actor playing Kipps tells Kipps 'We'll make an Irving of you yet,' in Act 1, as Kipps is not a very good actor due to his inexperience.

In the political sitcom Yes, Prime Minister (sequel to Yes, Minister), in the episode "The Patron of the Arts", first aired on 14 January 1988, the Prime Minister is asked what was the last play he'd seen, and replies "Hamlet." When asked "Whose?" — specifically, who played Hamlet, not who wrote it — he is unable to remember and is prompted with the suggestion "Henry Irving?" to audience laughter.

Biography
In 1906, Bram Stoker published a two-volume biography about Irving called Personal Reminiscences of Henry Irving.

See also
Irving Family

Notes

References

Further reading

Stoker, Bram. Personal Reminiscences of Henry Irving: Volume 1 and Volume 2. London : W. Heinemann, 1906. Scanned books via Internet Archive.
Archer, William 1885. Henry Irving, Actor and Manager: A Critical Study, London:Field & Tuer.
Beerbohm, Max. 1928. 'Henry Irving' in A Variety of Things. New York, Knopf.
Holroyd, Michael. 2008. A Strange Eventful History, Farrar Straus Giroux, 
Irving, Laurence. 1989. Henry Irving: The Actor and His World. Lively Arts.

External links

The Irving Society
The Henry Irving Foundation
Information about Irving at the PeoplePlay UK website
NY Times article that includes information about Irving's American tour and the lease of the Lyceum to the American company at the same time
My First "Reading" by Henry Irving, an article written by Irving about a personal experience
Henry Irving North American Theatre Online with bio and pics
 Henry Irving-Ellen Terry tour correspondence, 1884-1896, held by the Billy Rose Theatre Division, New York Public Library for the Performing Arts
 
 

1838 births
1905 deaths
English male stage actors
English male Shakespearean actors
19th-century English male actors
20th-century English male actors
19th-century theatre
Actor-managers
Knights Bachelor
Actors awarded knighthoods
English people of Cornish descent
People from South Somerset (district)
Burials at Westminster Abbey
Freemasons of the United Grand Lodge of England
19th-century theatre managers
20th-century theatre managers
Members of The Lambs Club